Ryan Lott (born 1979) is an American musician. He founded the band Son Lux which has released five albums and four EPs. The band's most recent album Brighter Wounds appeared in February 2018, the preceding album Remedy appeared in May 2017. He is also a member of Sisyphus and has scored the soundtracks for a number of films, most notably Everything Everywhere All at Once (2022), Mean Dreams (2017), Paper Towns (2015), and The Disappearance of Eleanor Rigby (2013). In 2020, Lott composed the soundtrack for the adventure game Tell Me Why. In 2022, Ryan released a course on designing sample-based instruments with online music school Soundfly.

Discography

As Son Lux

As Ryan Lott

Albums 

 Original Music From And Inspired By: The Disappearance Of Eleanor Rigby (Glassnote, 2014) (as/with Son Lux)
 Sisyphus (Asthmatic Kitty/Joyful Noise, 2014) (with Sisyphus, as Son Lux)
 Pentaptych (2019)
 Quartered (2020) (with Third Coast Percussion)

EPs 

 Beak & Claw (Anticon, 2012) (with Sisyphus, as Son Lux)

Soundtracks 

 Tell Me Why: Original Video Game Soundtrack (2020)

Collaborations 
 First (2017) (with yMusic)
 S16 (2020) (with Woodkid)

References

External links 
 

1979 births
Living people
Musicians from New York (state)
American rock musicians
Sisyphus (hip hop group) members